Ernesto Shaw (born January 8, 1975), better known as DJ Clue, is an American disc jockey (DJ), record producer, radio personality and record executive.

Early life 
DJ Clue was born in Queens, New York City to Panamanian and Jamaican immigrants.

Career 
DJ Clue has his own program, titled "Desert Storm Radio", every Monday to Friday 6:00 pm – 10:00 pm, on Power 105.1 in New York. Prior to this, he disc-jockeyed at Hot 97, until 2006.

In 1998, DJ Clue founded Desert Storm Records, a record label, with his childhood friends Skane Dolla (manager) and recording engineer Ken Duro Ifill.

In 1999, DJ Clue took part in the Hard Knock Life Tour, including a stop in Toronto at the Air Canada Centre.

In 2005, DJ Clue appeared as himself in the video game Grand Theft Auto: Liberty City Stories, hosting a fictional hip-hop radio station The Liberty Jam.

Discography

Albums 
 The Professional (1998)
 The Professional 2 (2001)
 The Professional 3 (2006)

Soundtracks 
 DJ Clue? Presents: Backstage Mixtape (2000)

Remixes 
 "Heartbreaker" (Remix) (featuring Da Brat & Missy Elliott) – Mariah Carey (1999)
 "Thank God I Found You/Make It Last Forever" (Remix) (featuring Joe & Nas) – Mariah Carey (1999)
 "It's Gonna Be Me" – *NSYNC (2000)
 "Best of Me Part II" – Mýa (featuring Jay-Z) (2000)
 "U Remind Me" (featuring Blu Cantrell and Method Man)- Usher (2001)
 "Overnight Celebrity" (Remix) (featuring Kanye West, Cam'ron and 50 Cent) – Twista (2005)
 "Mesmerized" (featuring Nas) – Faith Evans (2005)
 "How to Deal" – Frankie J (2005)
 "We Belong Together" (Remix) (featuring Styles P. and Jadakiss) – Mariah Carey (2005)
 "Shake It Off" (Remix) (featuring Jay-Z and Young Jeezy) – Mariah Carey (2005)
 "One Wish (Ray J song)" (featuring Fabolous) – Ray J (2005)
 "Don't Forget About Us" (Remix) (featuring Styles P. and Fabolous) – Mariah Carey (2006)
 "Ride for You" – Danity Kane (2006)
 "You Should Be My Girl" – Sammie (featuring Sean P) (2006)

Production 
 "Heartbreaker" (featuring Jay-Z) – Mariah Carey (1999)
 "Dope Man" – Jay-z (1999)
 "Superwoman Pt. II" (featuring Fabolous) – Lil' Mo (2001)
 "Last Night a DJ Saved My Life" (featuring Busta Rhymes and Fabolous) – Mariah Carey (2001)
 "Rich Friday" (featuring Future, Nicki Minaj, Juelz Santana & French Montana) – The Professional Pt. 4 (2013)

References

External links 
 
 
 Desert Storm Records

1975 births
Living people
African-American radio personalities
African-American record producers
American hip hop record producers
American music industry executives
Businesspeople from Queens, New York
Def Jam Recordings artists
Desert Storm Records artists
Mixtape DJs
Roc-A-Fella Records artists
Musicians from Queens, New York
Remixers
VJs (media personalities)
American hip hop DJs
Record producers from New York (state)
21st-century African-American people
20th-century African-American people